Fung Tak Road is a street in Kowloon's Diamond Hill neighbourhood, in Hong Kong. Chi Lin Nunnery, Nan Lian Garden, and Plaza Hollywood are nearby.

See also

 List of streets and roads in Hong Kong
 Public housing estates in Diamond Hill

References

External links
 

Diamond Hill
Roads in New Kowloon